Mars and Venus in the Bedroom: A Guide to Lasting Romance and Passion is a 1995 self-help relationship based book written by John Gray, author of Men Are from Mars, Women Are from Venus.  It is part in a series of books exploring the oft-clashing relationships between men and women.

Synopsis
John Gray brings his theories to enhancing the relationship in the bedroom and teaches his readers how to employ "advanced relationship skills" to create deeper intimacy while maintaining the passionate spark that was part of the couple's initial relationship.  What he believes is that the first step to achieving this is an acceptance of the differences between the sexes. Once there is acceptance, it is easier for the couple to make small but significant changes in attitudes, techniques, etc. The theory is that this will then result in a rekindling of passion.

Reviews
 "Gray's a plain, even pedestrian, writer, capable of talking about sex in a manner neither lubricious nor clinical... -Ray Olson, Booklist'' "From learning advanced skills for greater sex to achieving greater confidence in the bedroom, discovering the joy of quickies to rekindling the passion and keeping romance alive, John Gray has the answers for you." -HarperCollins Canada
 A New York Times'' Bestseller

References

External links
 http://www.harpercollins.ca/books/Mars-Venus-Bedroom-John-Gray/?isbn=9780061015717
 http://www.marsvenus.com/p/mars-venus-in-the-bedroom-paperback

Popular psychology
Self-help books
Gender studies books
HarperCollins books
1995 non-fiction books